Sarkis Elyas Lole, also known as Levon, was a prominent Armenian architect of the Ottoman Empire. Lole was the chief architect of Mardin and responsible for much of the late nineteenth- to early twentieth-century architecture of the city, as well as in neighboring Diyarbakır.

Due to his architectural skills and accomplishments, Lole is known as the “Mimar Sinan” of Mardin. He worked to preserve the homogeneity of the old town uniting the local style of Classical, Christian, and Islamic architecture. He built new schools, courthouses, barracks, mansions, and churches in Mardin, as well as, making repairs to the various historical mosques and madrasas of the city. Although working under the supervision of the central state, Lole's company functioned as private and managed a monopoly over the architectural landscape of Mardin.

History 

Sarkis Lole learned much about architecture from his father and is not known to have had any professional training. He was known to design his buildings by drawing in the sand. Lole was appointed the chief architect of Mardin by the Imperial Architects office of the Ottoman Empire; he inherited this position from his father who held it before him. His architectural style was said to be sophisticated in that he interspersed elements of European Renaissance and Gothic architecture within the local Islamic architectural framework of the city. Although having worked in Beirut, Lole is not known to have travelled to Europe. Moreover, as with other Ottoman Armenian architects of that time period such as Balyan and Nafilian, Lole chose rather to base his architecture on the predominant identity and cultures of the regions he worked in rather than on Armenian architecture. 

Lole commanded a team of apprentices that continued to carry out his architectural legacy after his death. From the memoirs of his descendants and those who worked on his team, Lole was responsible for a great deal of the architecture of Mardin, including the majority of the 19th-century mansions, churches, institutions, and even Islamic structures such as Mosques. In addition, Lole worked throughout Lebanon, notably in Beirut and Zahle. These accomplishments enabled Lole to be a very wealthy man and that wealth passed down to his descendants in Lebanon. Lole had a son named Corç Ertaş Kalfa who also worked as an architect in Mardin.

In 2011, under the instruction of the mayor of Mardin, the Turkish government proposed to restore the tomb of Sarkis Lole, as well as name a district after him. Previously, there was a street named after Lole in Mardin. According to Turkologist Andranik Ispiryan, this act was purely for the purpose of publicity. The Turkish government said they would contact Lole's descendants who now live in Aleppo and Beirut for consent on restoring Lole's tomb.

Works 
Some of Lole's most prominent architectural works include:

 The Mardin Post Office/The Șahtana house
 The Mardin Museum
 The Vocational School for girls
 Minaret of Șehidye Mosque
 Surp Hovsep Armenian Catholic Church of Mardin
 Armenian Catholic Church of Diyarbakir
 American University of Beirut
 Hotel America, Zahle

See also 
 List of Armenian architects

Footnotes

Sources 
 
 
 
 
 
 
 
 

Architects from the Ottoman Empire
Armenians from the Ottoman Empire
Ethnic Armenian architects
People from Mardin

19th-century births
20th-century deaths

Year of birth unknown
Year of death unknown